Symbiezidium is a genus of liverworts in the family Lejeuneaceae.

Species include:
Symbiezidium barbiflorum
Symbiezidium dentatum
Symbiezidium kroneanum
Symbiezidium madagascariensis
Symbiezidium setosum
Symbiezidium transversale
Symbiezidium viridissimum

References

Porellales genera
Lejeuneaceae
Taxonomy articles created by Polbot